Marina Trofimova (1981-1986 Karpak; born on 16 February 1964 in Tallinn) is an Estonian butterfly, freestyle and medley swimmer.

In 1985 she graduated from the Tartu State University in physical education.

From 1981 to 1985 she became 15-times Estonian champion in different disciplines at summer championships, and from 1983 to 1985 10-times at winter championships.

From 1978 to 1985 she was a member of Estonian national swimming team.

In 1980 she was named to Estonian Athlete of the Year.

References

1964 births
Living people
Estonian female butterfly swimmers
Estonian female freestyle swimmers
Estonian female medley swimmers
University of Tartu alumni